Fatima Kyari Mohammed is the Permanent Observer of the African Union to the United Nations.

Education 
She holds a bachelor's degree in environmental design from the Ahmadu Bello University Nigeria, a Master of Business Administration degree from the European University, a master's degree in sustainable economic development from the United Nations University of Peace, and a Master of Arts degree in peace, security, development and conflict transformation from the University of Innsbruck, Austria.

Career 
Prior to her appointment as Permanent Observer of the African Union to the United Nations, Ms. Mohammed was a Senior Special Adviser to the Economic Community of West African States (ECOWAS) Commission, with a focus on peace and security, regional integration and organizational development. Before joining ECOWAS, she was the Executive Director at West Africa Conflict and Security Consulting. Earlier, she worked as a Program Manager at the European Union Delegation to Nigeria and ECOWAS; and as Regional Project Manager for Security Policy Projects in West Africa.

Awards 
Fatima was nominated for the Outstanding Woman In Peace Building Award, by NCMG international

References 

Living people
United Nations General Assembly observers
Year of birth missing (living people)